Lichenochora is a genus of fungi in the family Phyllachoraceae. It has 44 species. All species in the genus are lichenicolous, meaning they grow parasitically on lichens. The genus was circumscribed by Josef Hafellner in 1989, with Lichenochora thallina assigned as the type species.

Genera
Lichenochora acutispora 
Lichenochora aipoliae 
Lichenochora aprica 
Lichenochora arctica 
Lichenochora atrans 
Lichenochora bacidiispora 
Lichenochora bellemerei 
Lichenochora caloplacae 
Lichenochora chimaerica 
Lichenochora clauzadei 
Lichenochora coarctatae 
Lichenochora collematum 
Lichenochora constrictella 
Lichenochora coppinsii 
Lichenochora elegans 
Lichenochora epidesertorum 
Lichenochora epifulgens 
Lichenochora epimarmorata 
Lichenochora epinashii 
Lichenochora gahavisukae 
Lichenochora galligena 
Lichenochora haematommatum 
Lichenochora heppiae 
Lichenochora hypanica 
Lichenochora hyperphysciae 
Lichenochora inconspicua 
Lichenochora lecidellae 
Lichenochora lepidiotae 
Lichenochora makareviczae 
Lichenochora mediterraneae 
Lichenochora monegrina 
Lichenochora obscuroides 
Lichenochora paucispora 
Lichenochora physciicola 
Lichenochora polycoccoides 
Lichenochora pyrenodesmiae 
Lichenochora rinodinae 
Lichenochora sinapispermae 
Lichenochora tertia 
Lichenochora thallina 
Lichenochora thorii 
Lichenochora verrucicola 
Lichenochora wasseri 
Lichenochora weillii 
Lichenochora xanthoriae

References

Sordariomycetes genera
Phyllachorales
Taxa named by Josef Hafellner
Taxa described in 1989
Lichenicolous fungi